Farida Nana Efua Bedwei (born 6 April 1979) is a Ghanaian software engineer and cofounder of Logiciel, a fin-tech company in Ghana. Farida Bedwei has built mobile and enterprise applications, and is also known for her knowledge of software architecture, and deploying mobile services, particularly for banking applications.

Early life 
Farida was born in Lagos, Nigeria and spent her early childhood living in three different countries (Dominica, Grenada and UK) due to the nature of her fathers job with the United Nations Development Programme. She was diagnosed with cerebral palsy at the age of one. Her family moved to Ghana when she was 9 years old and was home schooled until 12 years.

Education 
She was home schooled until the age of 12 when she was first sent to a government school in Ghana. Farida's parent at the tender age of 15 noticed her early passion for computers and decided to enrol her in a one-year computer course at the St. Michael information technology centre, making her one of the youngest in the class and also enabled her to skip high school. She later obtained a one-year degree in Computer Science from the University of Hertfordshire in the United Kingdom (from 2004 to 2005) and further acquired a certificate in Project Management in 2009 from the Ghana Institute of Management and Public Administration (GIMPA).

Career 
Farida Bedwei began her career as a software developer at Soft Company Ltd (now known as the Softtribe), and moved from there to Rancard Solutions Ltd, where she progressed from the position of solutions analyst to Senior Software Architect from 2001 to 2010.

At Rancard Solutions, she was responsible for the development and maintenance of mobility platforms. One of her achievements at Rancard Solutions include the development of a content management system for the Commission for Human Rights and Administrative Justice and PayBureau, an enterprise web-based payroll application for KPMG Accra to facilitate simultaneous management of payroll services for different companies.

In 2010, Bedwei moved to G-Life Microfinance where she was responsible for designing and implementing new products and services. In April 2011, she left to set up her own company, Logiciel Ltd, Accra, Ghana, where she is the co-founder and chief technology officer. At Logiciel Ltd, she led the creation and successful implementation of gKudi, a web-based (cloud) banking software suite for the micro-finance industry, used by 130 micro-finance institutions nationwide.

In 2015, she authored her first book, a mini-autobiography titled: Definition of a miracle. She has since received several awards and appointments including her appointment to the Board of Ghana's National Communication Authority.

Farida also created a cerebral palsy superhero. Her comic character called Karmzah gets her power from her crutches that she has to use for her cerebral palsy.

Achievements and awards 
 2018 – Special Award by President Abdel Fattah El SISI.
 2013 – Winner of Most Influential Women in Business and Government Award Financial Sector.
 2012 – Special Award by President John Mahama.
 2011 – Legacy and Legacy Ideas Award – Winner of the Maiden Award.

References

External links 
 http://mightyafrican.blogspot.com/2011/03/disability-is-not-inability-inspiration.html
 http://goinghana.blogspot.com/2011/04/farida-bedwei-definition-of-miracle.html
https://www.linkedin.com/in/fbedwei/

Living people
1979 births
Ghanaian women computer scientists
Ghanaian women engineers
Ghana Institute of Management and Public Administration alumni
Scientists with disabilities